Brigadier general Abdulrahman Kuliya (2 February 1968 – 21 May 2021) was a Nigerian military officer. He died in a military plane crash including the Chief of Army Staff (COAS) Lieutenant General Ibrahim Attahiru and 9 other military officers on active service.

He rose to the rank of Brigadier General in the Nigerian Army. He has held several appointments during his career including Director, Land Warfare at the Armed Forces Command and Staff College. Abdulrahman was the Chief of Military Intelligence – Nigerian Army Intelligence Corps until his death on 21 May 2021.

References 

1968 births
2021 deaths
Nigerian military officers
Nigerian generals
People from Kano State
Victims of aviation accidents or incidents in 2021